Colin George Youren (3 June 1939 – 20 July 2015) was an Australian rules footballer who played for Hawthorn in the Victorian Football League (VFL). His father George Youren played for Collingwood in 1919.

A wingman, Youren was a member of Hawthorn's inaugural premiership side in 1961 and represented Victoria at interstate football. He died in 2015 from cancer.

Honours and achievements
Hawthorn
 VFL premiership player: 1961
 2× Minor premiership: 1961, 1963

Individual
 Hawthorn life member

References

External links

1939 births
2015 deaths
Australian rules footballers from Victoria (Australia)
Hawthorn Football Club players
Hawthorn Football Club Premiership players
People educated at Scotch College, Melbourne
One-time VFL/AFL Premiership players